Ebon may refer to:

Places

Marshall Islands
 The Marshallese language
 Short for the Ebon Atoll
 Ebon, Marshall Islands, the largest city on Ebon Atoll
 Ebon Airport (IATA; EBO) at Ebon

Elsewhere
 Ebon, Kentucky
 Ebon Peak, a mountain on the border of Alberta and British Columbia, Canada 
 Ebon Pond, a pond in the Brown Peninsula, Victoria Land, Antarctica

People

Given name
Ebon Andersson, Swedish politician (1896-1969) 
Ebon Clark Ingersoll, American politician (1831 – 1879)
Ebon Moss-Bachrach, American actor born 1977

Surname
Martin Ebon, pen-name of German-American author Hans Martin Schwarz (1917 – 2006)

Fictional characters
 Ebon, the alias of character Ivan Evans in Static Shock

Fiction
 Ebon, a 2014 novel by Robin McKinley
 Ebon, a fictional planet in The Outer Limits episode "Nightmare"

Other
Made of ebony
 Black in color

See also
 
 Ebontius, saint and Bishop of Barbastro
 E.Bon Holdings, a public group listed in the Hong Kong Stock Exchange Limited
 Ebone (disambiguation)
 Ebony (disambiguation)